Glaciihabitans is a genus of bacteria from the family Microbacteriaceae.

References

Microbacteriaceae
Bacteria genera
Taxa described in 2014